The Julang-1 (also known as the JL-1; NATO reporting name CSS-N-3) was China's first generation nuclear submarine-launched ballistic missile (SLBM). According to a US Department of Defense report in 2011, the operational status of the JL-1 was "questionable".

History
Research and development began in 1967 and detailed design in the early 1970s, with a first land launch 30 April 1982 and a sea launch from a Project 629A (Golf) class submarine on 12 October 1982. The general designer of the missile was Huang Weilu, and Chen Deren (1922 – 21 December 2007) served as his deputy. The missile was assembled at Factory 307 (now Nanjing Dawn Group [南京晨光集团]).

The JL-1 was deployed on Xia class submarine in 1986. The Type 092 Xia class nuclear submarine has 12 launch tubes.

The JL-1 was initially tested and deployed on the PLAN's modified Golf class SSB. The Golf has since been modified again for further testing of other missiles, such as the JL-2, which has test-launched multiple times with varying levels of success.

The DF-21 appears to be a land-based version of the JL-1. As of 2018, the JL-1 and its warheads are believed to have been retired and dismantled.

See also
 JL-2
 R-29 Vysota
 R-29RM Shtil
 R-29RMU Sineva
 R-29RMU2 Layner
 RSM-56 Bulava
 UGM-133 Trident II
 M45 (missile)
 M51 (missile)
 K Missile family
 Pukkuksong-1
 R-39 Rif
 R-39M

References

 Norris, Robert, Burrows, Andrew, Fieldhouse, Richard "Nuclear Weapons Databook, Volume V, British, French and Chinese Nuclear Weapons, San Francisco, Westview Press, 1994, 
 Lewis, John Wilson and Xue Litai, "China's Strategic Seapower: The Politics of Force Modernization in the Nuclear Age," Stanford, 1994.

Submarine-launched ballistic missiles of the People's Republic of China
Nuclear weapons of the People's Republic of China
1960s establishments in China
Military equipment introduced in the 1980s